Ron Gower (born 6 March 1929) was an Australian boxer. He competed at the 1948 Summer Olympics and the 1952 Summer Olympics.

Ron Gower placed 9th as a Flyweight in the 1948 Summer Olympics, and 15th as a Bantamweight in the 1952 Summer Olympics. 

He also competed in the 1950 British Empire Games. He died in Tasmania on 8 February 2018.

References

1929 births
Living people
Australian male boxers
Olympic boxers of Australia
Boxers at the 1948 Summer Olympics
Boxers at the 1952 Summer Olympics
Place of birth missing (living people)
Flyweight boxers